MGP Junior (standing for Melodi Grand Prix) is a Danish song contest for children aged 8 to 15. It originated in 2000 as a spin-off of Dansk Melodi Grand Prix, before coming the national selection for the now-extinct MGP Nordic in 2002 and from 2006 to 2009. From 2003 to 2005, MGP Junior was Denmark's national selection for the Junior Eurovision Song Contest, a pan-European version of the format. The songs are performed primarily in Danish and written by the participants themselves. Many past contestants have gone on to be renowned recording artists, such as 2002's Morten Fillipsen, 2003's Anne Gadegaard, and 2014's Emma Pi Hedeboe.

History 
MGP was first held in 2000 under the name Børne1erens Melodi Grand Prix, but starting 2001, it was changed to the present name MGP (short for Melodi Grand Prix) but not to be confused with Dansk Melodi Grand Prix, a competition for adult singers to qualify for the Eurovision Song Contest.

In 2002, the idea of MGP for Juniors caught on in other Scandinavian countries and became a pan-Scandinavian Nordic competition under the name MGP Nordic with national selections in Sweden and Norway in addition to the existing Danish MGP (Junior) selection.

In 2003, MGP became even greater, with the EBU holding a European Song Contest at Forum in Copenhagen on 15 November 2003. It was named the Junior Eurovision Song Contest.

In 2006, Denmark, Sweden and Norway opted out of the pan-European contest and MGP Nordic resumed. They said their withdrawal from the pan-European competition was in protest to treatment of the competitors in the European version.

In 2007 membership for MGP Nordic expanded to include Finland. In 2010, Denmark's MGP Junior was not held after Sweden pulled out and instead sent their winner to the Junior Eurovision Song Contest. DR eventually revived MGP (Junior) in early 2011 and is nowadays held a week before or after the regular Dansk Melodi Grand Prix.

Presenters

Camilla Ottesen (2000–03)
 (2000)
 (2000)
René Dif (2001)
 (2002–03)
 (2002)
 (2004)
Christine Milton (2004)
 (2005, 2008, 2012–13, 2021)
 (2006–08)
 (2006)
 (2007)
 (2009)
Sofie Linde Lauridsen (2009, 2014–15)
Peter Mygind (2011)
 (2012)
Shirley (2013)
Ole Thestrup (2013)
 (2014)
Søren Rasted (2015)
 (2014–16, 2019–2020)
 (2016–17)
Barbara Moleko (2017)
Mette Lindberg (2018)
 (2018, 2020)
 (2019)
 (2021–2022)
Stephania Potalivo (since 2022)
 (2023–present)

Winners of Danish MGP

MGP album series
(Winning song in bold)

The MGP organization has released compilation albums for many years. Many of these album releases have made it to the top of the Danish Albums Chart.

MGP 2000
Original title: Børne1erens Melodi Grand Prix
Track list
4x tabere – "Vi fører os frem"
Sandra Elsfort – "Chicoolar"
FeminimuM – "Sort sort snak"
Cecilie Jensen – "Du tog det hele fra mig"
SIXPACK – "Gone"

MGP 2001
Full title: MGP 2001: De unges Melodi Grand Prix (back cover)
Track list
Three In One – "Du Kan Sige Ja-Ja" 
Tøsepigerne – "Ti Amo" 
Shit Kid – "Når Vi Sparker Biiip"
Hope – "Den Første Store Kærlighed"
Bips'n Chips – "Computersangen" 
Krate – "Drømmeland"
Cocktail – "Uma Ma"
Michelle Siel – "Himlen Danser Sort"
Zabian Zoul – "Du Er Min Kærlighed" 
Sisse – "Du Har Brug For Mig"

MGP 2002
Full title: MGP 2002: De unges Melodi Grand Prix
Track list
Emma – "Du er den som jeg vil ha'" 
Simon – "Alene"
Pay Off – "Dig og mig"
Team Theis – "Turbofluen" 
Alexandra & Charlotte – "Venskaber"
Razz – "Kickflipper" 
Linette – "Klappesangen" 
Heartbeat – "Din kærlighed" 
Morten Fillipsen – "Du er ikke som de andre pi'r"
Monica – "Bare jeg ku' Forklare"

MGP 2003
Full title: MGP 2003: De unges Melodi Grand Prix
Track list
Julie og Sofie – "Vi er venner"
Eby – "Jeg er den jeg er"
B-Boys – "Vi gi'r den op"
Linette – "Den eneste ene"
Tue – "Ta' mig som jeg er"
Shout – "Jeg tror, det kaldes kærlighed"
Alexander – "Super sød sag"
Nanna – "Er der nogen der ved"
Sami – "Hvad hvis nu"
Anne – "Arabiens drøm"

MGP 2004
Full title: MGP 2004: De unges Melodi Grand Prix
Track list
Simone – "Hvorfor gik du din vej?"
Green Kidz – "På en grøn grøn sommerdag"
G=Beat – "Buster Buster" 
Frigg – "Jeg ka' li' det" 
Cool Kids – "Pigen er min" 
Line Rømer – "Stop Stop" 
Amalie og Frederikke – "Tænker på et kram"
Cozy – "Helt speciel" 
Nico & Julie – "Første blik"
C-Kat – "Det er helt utroligt"

MGP 2005
Full title: MGP 2005: De unges Melodi Grand Prix
Track list
Nanna & Annisette - "Venindetanker"	
Marieke - "Musikken"	
Lucas - "Fest Her"	
Jeans - "Jeg kan nemlig godt li dig"	
Karoline & Zoe - "Et Stjerneskud"	
LBS - "Superman"
Signe K - "Kære fru lærer"
Twiz - "Du må forstå"
Julia - "Sol og Sommer"	
Nicolai- "Shake shake shake"

MGP 2006
Full title: MGP 2006: De unges Melodi Grand Prix
Track list
Lulu-Ley – "Det bedste jeg ved" 
FOZ'N'S – "Mit hood" 
C-Power – "S, P eller K" 
The Rollings – "Skal vi vædde?" 
WeMix – "Få din boogie på" 
Pippi Punk – "De gamle damer" 
SEB – "Tro på os to" 
Lil G – "Penge" 
MAMS – "Bang Bang" 
SMSJKM – "Der var en dreng, der ku' li' en pige"

MGP 2007
Full title: MGP 2007: De unges Melodi Grand Prix
Peak position: #1 (for 2 weeks in September/October 2007)
Track list
Glitter – "Vi breaker"
Mathias – "Party"
DK-Tøserne – "Vi er gode venner"
Game Over – "Drømmelandet"
efeA-5 – "Oliver" 
Da Boyz – "Super Snap"
Hjerteglimmer – "Hjerteveninder"
Kristian D-nay – "Pigen jeg kan li'" 
Amalie – "Til solen står op"
The Rollers – "Charlotte"

MGP 2008
Full title: MGP 2008: Det er bare noget vi leger
Peak position: #1 (for 3 weeks in October 2008)
Track list
Filotte – "Rockstar"
The Johanssons – "En for alle, alle for en"
Fivo Nivo – "Hallo"
The Ugly Ducklings – "Kaospigen"
Play-Full – "Vi Chiller"
The Emilies – "Lige meget hvad"
Zigi – "Hey Hey"
S.P. Mix – "Danse natten lang"
Årgang 93 – "Kun om mig"
Sandra Monique – "Hola Chica"

MGP 2009
 First contest without in-studio band
Full title: MGP 2009: Det er bare noget vi leger
Peak position: #1 (for 2 weeks in October 2009)
Track list
Vi2 – "Brug for dig"
Niclas – "Fyr den af"
Engledrys – "Familien, min bedste ven"
Anna – "Jeg kunne alt"
The Futures – "Min MSN ven"
Tøserne Fra Tredje – "Venner"
Diamond Souls – "Kom vis dem hva' du ka'"
Caroline – "Fanget i et eventyr"
 Pelle B – "Kun min"
Sarah Julia – "Gi' mig sommer og sol"
MGP Allstars 2009 – "Det er bare noget, vi leger!" (first joint song)

MGP 2011
Peak position: #1 (for 5 weeks in March/April 2011)
Track list
Emol, R-B-G: "Vores Verden"
Kastanie – "Sara og Felicia"
Chestnut Avenue – "Tro på dig selv"
Cooly Girly – "Hvis jeg havde dig…"
ZAK – "Kan du føle den"
Nina – "Her ved mit klaver"
Joy Joy – "Lattergas"
Isabella – "Rockstar"
Chanlex – "Min egen Maria"
Chokit – "Ta' dig nu sammen du"
MGP Allstars 2011 – "Fantalastisk"

MGP 2012
Peak position: #1 (for 6 weeks in February/March 2012)
Track list
The Allstars – "De hotteste kærester"
Astrid – "Et kvarter"
De to Amigos – "Mig og min amigo" 
Sofie – "En lille del af dig"
Josephine – Kærestebrev
MC Vernes – "Bedre tider på vej"
Energy – "Jeg bli'r ved" 
Sille – "En sidste kærlighedståre"
Freja-Bella – "Jeg elsker at drømme"
Moriwa – "Kom alle venner" 
MGP Allstars 2012 – "Nul komma snart"

MGP 2013
Peak position: #1 (starting February 2013)
Track list
Artbreakers – "Skolefest"
Kristian – "Den første autograf" 
Joli – "Mens du ung"
Julie and the Jets – "Lad os følges ad"
Hugo & Elliot – "Håndværkerrøv" (feat. Stereo Moves) 
Silmania – 'Følelser"
Sofia and the Sugarcubes – "Når dine øjne, de smiler"
3Kløver – "Mit et og alt"
Cindy & Sofie – "Helt alene"
Cecilie – "Ingen som dig" 
MGP Allstars 2013 – "Hvor drømme bli'r til virkelighed"

MGP 2014
Track list
Lærke – "Så Ta' Den Dog" 
Marius – "Dig Og Mig"
The Cone Zone – "Den Sure Nabo"
Benedikte K. & The Sisters – "Det' For Sent Nu" 
Marcus – "Julie"
Emma Pi – "Du Ser Den Anden Vej" 
The Lucis – "Aldrig Gå Din Vej"
Simone & Anemone – "Drømmeland"
Black Moon – "Fun in the Summer"
Chili – "Ikke Uden Dig"
MGP Allstars 2014 – "Din Melodi"

MGP 2015
Track list
UZZ – "Op Til Månen"
The Tumbles – "Sommer i Danmark" 
Flora Ofelia – "Du Du Du" 
Tyrhan – "Tro på dig selv"
Dicte – "Du Må Ikke Gå Fra Mig"
Lady Birdz – "En Dag"
Caroline Sophia – "Mer' End Bare Venner"
Tyrees Tyr - "Guldet"
Ten Eyes – "Hun Er Alt For Perfekt" 
Emma Rosa – "Du Er En Vinder"
MGP Allstars 2015 – "Ramt af MGP"

MGP 2016
Track list
Sofie & Augusta – "Den sødeste dreng"
Bølle – "Ballade"
Edda – "Helt Okay"
Meeh – "Os 2 For Altid"
TEENAGERS – "Teenagers"
Froja & Sarah – "Hvor bliver du af?" 
Ida – "Min egen sang"
JEEN – "Jeg savner dig" 
Ida og Lærke – "Bar' for vildt" 
Phillip – "Kongensgade"
MGP Allstars 2016 – "Vores MGP"

MGP 2017 
Track list
 Good Harmony - "Den Fedeste Dag"
 Amanda - "Stop Dit Drilleri"
 JEPPANNA - "Jeg Kan Gøre, Hvad Jeg Vil" 
 Minna - "Ligesome I Alle Film"
 Oskar - "Danmark"
 Caroline Selma - "Mega Irriterende"
 Maja & Annika - "Ikke Mere"
 Bastian - "Frikvarter" 
 Frida Oline - "Måden, Det Bli'r Sagt På"
 Edward - "Dans Med Mig" 
 MGP Allstars 2017 - "Vi Gør Det Igen"

MGP 2018 
Track list
 Ella, Klara & Sidsel - "Godt at Være Venner"
 The One & Only Boyband - "Dine Rettigheder"
 Melissa & Victoria - "Jeg Elsker Dig" 
 Mille - "Til Næste År" 
 Toby Oby - "Youtube"
 The Angels - "Her & Nu"
 A&T - "Det Du Gør"
 Milo - "Se Mig"
 Thea og Rita - "Hvis Børn Ku,Bestemme"
 Celina - "Maskebal"
 Ultra - "Sang nr.11" (Made  by the host channel) 
 MGP Allstars 2018 - "På Vingerne"

MGP  2019 
Track list

Astrid - "Når jeg danser"
Elio - "Musik gør mig glad"
Olivia - "Min drøm"
Alma Sophie - "Rulle skøjteløb"
Kiyan - "Stilen er ekstra"
SODA - "Bedste veninder"
The Wave - "DEn nYE  treND"
Johannes - "Sig det nu"
Lisa & Xenia - "Ham, som troede"
Karla Sofie - "Vild med dig"
MGP Allstars 2019 - "kontrol"

MGP  2020 
Track list
JAAIIL - "Superhelten"
Karla & Liva - "Brug din fantasi"
Julie - "Stjernen i det blå"
Siff - "Mit hjerte der griner"
Mynthe - "Syng det ud"
Liva - "Ingen plan B"
William - "Stjerneskud"
D&A - "Boomdabah Basta"
MGP Allstars 2020 - "Du ved hvad der skal ske"

MGP 2021 
Track list
Mikkel	- "Jeg tror på kærlighed"
Alva & Noemi - "Følg dine drømme"	
Emilie	- "Ikke som de andre piger"
Justin Le - "Lægger planer"	
Bubble Girls - "Pinlig"	
Adede - "Inden i mig"	
Tinke & the Winkies - "Regnbuer"	
Super Brothers	- "Vi vil ha lov"
MGP Allstars 2021 - "MGP Gør Dig Flyvende"

MGP 2022 
Track list
7even - "Min mobil"
Jonas Funk - "Ud til verdens ende"
Alohomora - "Drenge og piger"
Isso - "Mamacita"
Emma - "Hater"
LUMA - "Fri"
The Raptiles - "Popcorn"
The Specials - "Som vi er"
MGP Allstars 2022 - "Vi er så MGP"

MGP 2023 
Track list
EliNova - "Mod strømmen"
Dysseband - "På tur"
Frederik - "Pre-teen"
Girls on Fire - "Drømme"
The Five - "Tænk dig om"
Gustav & Magne - "Gi' dem til mig"
Sophia - "Det' bare tanker"
PomfrIDA & MAYAnnaise - "Hemmelighed"
MGP Allstars 2023 - "Mega giga MGP"

See also
MGP Nordic, pan-Scandinavian contest
Melodi Grand Prix Junior (selection for Norway)
Lilla Melodifestivalen (selection for Sweden)
Junior Eurovision Song Contest, pan-European contest
List of Danish number-one hits

Notes

References

MGP Nordic
Music competitions in Denmark
Junior Eurovision Song Contest
2000 establishments in Denmark
2000 Danish television series debuts